Liotella petalifera is a species of sea snail, a marine gastropod mollusk in the family Skeneidae.

Description
(Original description by Hedley & May) The height of the shell attains 0.6 mm, its diameter 1.2 mm. The minute, white shell has a subdiscoidal shape. Its spire is very little elevated. The base of the shell is broadly and deeply umbilicate.  The shell contains 4 whorls, of which two constitute the protoconch, the last descending, and in slight contact with its predecessor. The protoconch is smooth, helicoid, and sharply defined. The sculpture of the shell shows in the body whorl twenty-four, in the penultimate whorl nineteen, elevated curled and forwardly-directed lamellae, whose broad summits nearly equal their interstices. The lamellae are smooth and glossy, but the interstices are distantly spirally striated. The aperture is complete circular.

Distribution
This marine species is endemic to Australia and occurs off Queensland to South Australia and off Tasmania, at depths between 73 m and 183 m.

References

 Laseron, C. 1954. Revision of the Liotiidae of New South Wales. Aust. Zool. Vol. 12 (1) pp. 1–25, figs 1-49a
 Cotton, B. C. (1959). South Australian Mollusca. Archaeogastropoda. Adelaide. : W.L. Hawes. 449 pp., 1 pl.

External links
 Seashells of New South Wales: Liotella petalifera

petalifera
Gastropods of Australia
Gastropods described in 1908